The Financial Market Infrastructure Act (FMIA), original title  is a body of Swiss legislation for the regulation of financial markets, in particular derivatives. It was originally adopted by the Swiss Federal Assembly on June 19, 2015 and came into force on January 1, 2016. 

The objective of the legislation is to reduce systemic counterparty and operational risk, and help prevent future financial system collapses.  FMIA is intended as the Swiss equivalent to the regulatory packages in the U.S. and the European Union, such as Dodd–Frank and EMIR / MiFID, respectively.

The FMIA regulations include requirements for reporting of derivative contracts and implementation of risk management standards. It also established common rules for central counterparties and trade repositories. The implementation of FMIA is overseen by FINMA.

Footnotes

Sources 
 FMIA Legal Act, translation of Bundesgesetz über die Finanzmarktinfrastrukturen und das Marktverhalten im Effekten- und Derivatehandel (Finanzmarktinfrastrukturgesetz, FinfraG). In: Bundesblatt, Vol. 2015, No. 25 of 30 June 2015, pg. 4931–4983.
 FMIA Ordinance, Ordinance on Financial Market Infrastructures and Market Conduct in Securities and Derivatives Trading, translation of Verordnung über die Finanzmarktinfrastrukturen und das Marktverhalten im Effekten- und Derivatehandel (Finanzmarktinfrastrukturverordnung, FinfraV). In: Bundesblatt, Vol. 2015, pg. 5413–5508. (SR 958.11)
 European Trade Repository - FinfraG 

Financial regulation
Derivatives (finance)
Regulation in Switzerland
Corporate law
2016 establishments in Switzerland